This is a list of members of the South Australian House of Assembly from 1947 to 1950, as elected at the 1947 state election:

 Alexandra LCL MHA Sir Herbert Hudd died on 30 April 1948. LCL candidate David Brookman won the resulting by-election on 19 June.
 Rocky River LCL MHA John Lyons died on 19 December 1948. LCL candidate James Heaslip won the resulting by-election on 26 February.
 Wallaroo Labor MHA Robert Richards resigned on 22 November 1949 to take up a position as the Commonwealth's Administrator of Nauru. No by-election was held due to the imminent 1950 state election.
 Stanley MHA Percy Quirke was elected as a representative of the Labor Party, but resigned from the party in August 1948 and sat as an independent.

Members of South Australian parliaments by term
20th-century Australian politicians